Edward Irving Ludwig (October 7, 1899 – August 20, 1982) was a Russian-born American film director and writer. He directed nearly 100 films between 1921 and 1963 (some under the names Edward I. Luddy and Charles Fuhr).

Ludwig was born Ukraine, then part of the Russian Empire, entered the United States from Canada on March 6, 1911, became a naturalized citizen December 23, 1932, and died in Santa Monica, California.

Partial filmography

 Rip Van Winkle (1921)
 The Man Who Waited (1922)
What an Eye (1924) a haunted house comedy for Universal Pictures
 The Irresistible Lover (1927)
 Spuds (1927)
 Jake the Plumber (1927)
 The Girl from Woolworth's (1929)
 See America Thirst (1930)
 Steady Company (1932)
 They Just Had to Get Married (1932)
 A Woman's Man (1934)
 Let's Be Ritzy (1934)
 Friends of Mr. Sweeney (1934)
 The Man Who Reclaimed His Head (1934)
 Age of Indiscretion (1935)
 Three Kids and a Queen (1935)
 Old Man Rhythm (1935)
 Adventure in Manhattan (1936)
 Fatal Lady (1936)
 The Last Gangster (1937)
 Her Husband Lies (1937)
 That Certain Age (1938)
 Coast Guard (1939)
 Swiss Family Robinson (1940)
 The Man Who Lost Himself (1941)
 Born to Sing (1942)
 They Came to Blow Up America (1943)
 Bomber's Moon (co-director credited as "Charles Fuhr"; 1943)
 The Fighting Seabees (1944) with John Wayne
 Three Is a Family (1944)
 The Fabulous Texan (1947)
 Wake of the Red Witch (1948) with John Wayne
 The Big Wheel (1949) 
 Smuggler's Island (1951)
 Caribbean (1952)
 The Blazing Forest (1952)
 Sangaree (1953)
 The Vanquished (1953)
 Jivaro (1954)
 Flame of the Islands (1956)
 The Black Scorpion (1957)
 Maisie (1960)
 The Gun Hawk'' (1963)

References

External links

1899 births
1982 deaths
American film directors
American male screenwriters
Emigrants from the Russian Empire to the United States
20th-century American male writers
20th-century American screenwriters